James F. Hawkins is an American former actor, producer and writer. He is best-known for his TV roles in shows like Annie Oakley, The Adventures of Ozzie and Harriet, Leave It to Beaver, Petticoat Junction, and The Donna Reed Show; and as  Tommy Bailey, son of George Bailey in the 1946 film It's a Wonderful Life.

Personal life
Hawkins is the author of five books about the film It's A Wonderful Life, served on The Jimmy Stewart Museum Advisory Board, and for 20 years served on the board of directors of the Donna Reed Foundation for the Performing Arts. 

In celebration of the Frank Capra film, Hawkins and other cast members appear annually at the "It's A Wonderful Life Festival" in Seneca Falls, New York, the town thought to be the inspiration for the movie's setting of Bedford Falls.

Filmography (selection) 
 It's a Wonderful Life (1946) as Tommy Bailey
 The Ruggles (TV series, 1949-1952, 137 episodes) as Donald Ruggles
 Annie Oakley (TV series, 1954-1957, 81 episodes) as Tagg Oakley
 Dennis The Menace (TV series, 1961) as Chuck Long
 Leave It To Beaver (TV series, 1961) as Dudley McMillan
 Bringing Up Buddy (TV series, 1961, 3 episodes) as Fennimore Cooper
 Ichabod and Me (TV series, 1961-1962, 11 episodes) as Jonathan Baylor
 My 3 Sons (TV series, 1963)
 The Adventures of Ozzie and Harriet (TV series, 1962-1964) as Jimmy
 The Fugitive (TV series, 1963) as Carl Emery
 Girl Happy (1965) as Doc
 The Donna Reed Show (TV series, 1958-1965, 20 episodes)
 Petticoat Junction (1963-1967) (TV series, 9 episodes)
 Spinout (1966) as Larry
 Gidget (TV series, 1966) as Paul

References

External links 
 

Living people
20th-century American actors
American child actors
Year of birth missing (living people)